Benefact Trust (previously the Allchurches Trust) is a large national charity in the United Kingdom, established in 1972. It is headquartered in Gloucester. It is an independent registered charity. Its objects are to "make a positive difference to people's lives by funding, guiding and celebrating the work of churches and Christian charities; empowering the most vulnerable and giving people, communities and places a renewed opportunity to flourish." Initially, most of its grants were for the repair and maintenance of church buildings. Now it also supports projects that more widely benefit local communities and reflect changes in society.

History
The trust was set up to act as the beneficial owner of the insurance company Ecclesiastical Insurance. It was founded by the Church of England and signatories included the then Archbishop of Canterbury Michael Ramsey, the Archbishop of York Donald Coggan, the Dean of St Paul's Martin Sullivan, the Secretary General of the General Synod of the Church of England Sir John Guillum Scott and others. Benefact Trust continues to maintain close affiliation to the Church of England, its main beneficiary, and one of its stated funding policies is to provide Dioceses and Cathedrals with block grants to help in their ongoing running.

Governance
It is a registered charity under the name Benefact Trust Limited and its objects are to promote the Christian religion and to provide funds for other charitable purposes. The charity is governed by a board of trustees who set its strategic direction and ensure it meets its goals and objectives. The current chair is Tim Carroll.

Income
It does not fundraise; it derives its funds solely from the business it owns, Ecclesiastical Insurance and the subsidiary EdenTree Investment, which passes on to Benefact Trust a significant proportion of profits. In 2015, Benefact Trust received £23m from Ecclesiastical Insurance, enabling the trust to give £11.7m in grants to the Church of England dioceses, other Anglican denominations and other charitable projects.

A 2016 Thanksgiving service in Gloucester Cathedral marked the donation within three years of £50million to the trust from Ecclesiastical Insurance and its subsidiary. A personal message of thanks from Archbishop Justin Welby was read out by Bishop Nigel Stock, the Bishop at Lambeth and chair of the trust at the time. Ecclesiastical Insurance has set itself a new target of providing £100million for Benefact Trust by 2020.

Criticism
In 2017, survivors of church abuse criticised the nexus of corporate ties between Allchurches Trust, Ecclesiastical Insurance, and the Church of England.  Ecclesiastical was founded in 1887 by the Church of England to conserve the profits of the insurer for itself. Since the 1970s, its profits have been paid to Allchurches Trust, which makes substantial block grants to dioceses and cathedrals in addition to grants to many parishes. The nexus has been accused of resisting and restricting financial settlements because it is too closely affiliated with the Church itself. Research carried out in Companies House revealed the extent of these grants. It has been estimated that between 2014-2020 the Church of England will receive in the region of £100 million via Allchurches Trust. The search for information on Companies House also revealed that in addition to the senior church figures who have been trustees of the trust, numerous bishops and cathedral deans have been directors on the board of Ecclesiastical itself. In July 2017, a BBC Victoria Derbyshire programme commented that the insurer "has had a string of senior members of clergy on its board of directors."

Keith Porteous Wood, chair of the National Secular Society, commented

See also

Church Commissioners
Churches Conservation Trust
National Churches Trust

References

External links 

 

1972 establishments in the United Kingdom
Charities based in Gloucestershire
Christian charities based in the United Kingdom
Church of England societies and organisations
Gloucester
Organizations established in 1972
Religion in Gloucestershire